Ložnica pri Žalcu is a settlement north of Žalec in east-central Slovenia. The A1 motorway crosses the territory of the settlement north of the village. The area is part of the traditional region of Styria. The entire Municipality of Žalec is now included in the Savinja Statistical Region.

History
The settlement of Ložnica pri Žalcu was created in 1953, when the formerly separate villages of Spodnja Ložnica and Zgornja Ložnica were merged into a single settlement.

References

External links

Ložnica pri Žalcu at Geopedia

Populated places in the Municipality of Žalec